The Fédération Internationale des Archives de Télévision - International Federation of Television Archives (FIAT/IFTA) is a worldwide association of institutions, commercial companies and individuals managing or with a special interest in audiovisual archiving in general and television archives in particular. Many members are commercial and public broadcasters, but also national (audiovisual) archives are involved ever more. In general terms the association wants to connect the members, to spread knowledge in the field of television archiving and to defend their interests on an international level.

Organisation 

The goal of the federation is to create cooperation among television archives, multimedia and audiovisual archives and libraries. To meet these goals, FIAT/IFTA  provides  forums to share knowledge and experience. Some of FIAT/IFTA’s main objectives are to provide a forum for exchange of knowledge and experience between its members, to promote the study of any topic relevant to the development and use of audiovisual archives and to establish international standards on key issues regarding all aspects of audiovisual media archive management. FIAT/IFTA has over 250 members. The office is currently situated at the premises of Raidió Teilifís Éireann.

FIAT/IFTA has working relations with other organisations in the field, amongst others as a member of the Coordinating Council of Audiovisual Archives Associations.

Executive Council 

FIAT/IFTA is chaired by a president (elected every 2 years with one possible re-election) and a General Secretary.
The President, the General Secretary, the Treasurer and the Commission Chairs are ex-officio members of the Executive Council.
Next to these, the other Executive Council members, accumulating to a maximum of 12, are elected every 4 years, by groups of 6 alternating every 2 years.

Commissions 

Next to the Executive Council, FIAT/IFTA has got 4 commissions, each with 6 to 12 members and a chair:

Media Management Commission: the only commission existing since the founding of the organisation. It started off in 1977 as the 'Commission Systèmes Documentaires'. In 1981 the name was changed to 'Documentation Commission' and in 2001 to 'Media Management Commission'.
Preservation & Migration Commission: called into existence in 1982 as the 'Technical Commission' it existed up until 2000. In 2007 it was restarted as the Preservation & Migration Commission.
Value, Use and Copyright Commission: initiated in 2018.
Media Studies Commission: started off in 1998 as a bridge towards the academic research world in the field of television studies. It was called the 'Academic Research Work Group' and in 2000 renamed as the 'Television Studies Working Group'. From 2003 it grew to a true commission calling itself the 'Television Studies Commission'. In 2016 the current name 'Media Studies Commission' was adopted.

Initiatives

Conferences and seminars

FIAT/IFTA World Conference 

The FIAT/IFTA World Conference is held each year, usually in October. The evening programme includes an opening cocktail, a gala dinner and the annual FIAT/IFTA Archive Achievement Awards gala. The 2018 World Conference was held in Venice, hosted by RAI. The 2019 edition took place in Dubrovnik and was hosted by HRT. On 25 October 2019, FIAT/IFTA President Bríd Dooley announced that the 2020 edition will be a joint conference of FIAT/IFTA and the International Association of Sound and Audiovisual Archives in Dublin, but due to the worldwide COVID-19 pandemic and subsequent travel bans it was moved online. Both associations organised a General Assembly including elections for their Presidency and Executive Council at this 2020 online conference. FIAT/IFTA announced on 29 October 2020 that if the sanitary circumstances allow so, the 2021 FIAT/IFTA World Conference will be held in Cape Town, South Africa, and hosted by SACIA, the Southern African Communications Industries Association.

In the even years the World Conference also holds a General Assembly, during which the new president and a part of the Executive Council is elected. The Conference features keynotes speakers, panels discussions, workshops, masterclasses, case study presentations, social events, and networking opportunities.

Regional Seminars 

Next to this, FIAT/IFTA organises regional seminars around the globe, in order to focus on regional television archiving challenges. Recent editions were held in Rio de Janeiro (Regional Media Management Seminar, 2016), Bucharest (Regional Television Studies Seminar, 2015) and Dubai (Regional Preservation & Migration Seminar, 2008).

Media Management Seminars  

The Media Management Commission also organises a biannual seminar called 'Media Management Seminar' since 1998. The proceedings of these seminars are published and printed and freely available online via the FIAT/IFTA website. Recent editions were held in Stockholm (2019), Lugano (2017), Glasgow (2015), Hilversum (2013) and Toronto (2011).

FIAT/IFTA Archive Achievement Awards 

FIAT/IFTA Archive Achievement Awards is a series of three annual awards given for the best use of archival material, the best archive preservation project and the most innovative use of archival material. Several other categories have come up and disappeared over the course of the nineties and 2000s. Since 2014 also a Lifetime Achievement Award is attributed annually to a person with exceptional and enduring merits in the field of audiovisual archiving.

FIAT/IFTA Save Your Archive 

Save Your Archive is a program designed to help save endangered audiovisual collections. The ambition is to save the world audiovisual heritage, starting with a few collections. The Program does so by various means, including by providing financial support, training and/or technical assistance. The program speaks to FIAT/IFTA’s core mission – designing useful policies and tools to serve the archival community and developing cooperation among its members. The program works under the umbrella of the Archives at Risk campaign by the Coordinating Council of Audiovisual Archives Associations (CCAAA). Past projects in countries such as East Timor, Madagascar, Zimbabwe, Romania and Colombia have received help from the programme.

History 

FIAT/IFTA was founded as an association under French Law on 5 October 1977, when archives directors of mainly broadcasters but also national audiovisual archives felt the need to establish a separate organisation dedicated to television archives, as they were not accepted as members of the International Federation of Film Archives. Most members knew each other via the European Broadcasting Union. After preparative meetings in the course of 1976–77 in Paris, London and Rome, the first conference of FIAT/IFTA was held in October 1977 in Paris.
After Paris 1977, annual World Conferences took place all over the world:

Regarding the organisation of the federation, next to the ones mentioned above several other commissions have come and gone: 
 Training Commission: from 1977 to 1979 and from 1981 until 2006,
 Preservation and Selection Commission: from 1977 to 1986,
 Cultural Use Commission: from 1980 to 1982,
 Information Exchange Commission: from 1984 to 1986,

The past presidents of FIAT/IFTA were:

See also
 UNESCO Memory of the World
 UNESCO World Day for Audiovisual Heritage
 National Film Preservation Foundation
 Film preservation
 Optical media preservation

References

External links 

Association of Moving Image Archivists
AMIA annual conference website
Video Aids to Film Preservation

Organizations established in 1977
1977 establishments in France
Television archives
History of television
Archivist associations
History organisations based in the Republic of Ireland